The 2014 Iquique earthquake struck off the coast of Chile on 1 April, with a moment magnitude of 8.2, at 20:46 local time (23:46 UTC). The mainshock was preceded by a number of moderate to large shocks and was followed by a large number of moderate to very large aftershocks, including a M7.7 event on 3 April. The megathrust earthquake triggered a tsunami of up to  that hit Iquique at 21:05 local time (00:05 UTC, 2 April). Similar-sized tsunamis were also reported to have hit the coasts of Pisagua and Arica.

Geology

A number of mid-sized quakes struck the same area in the preceding weeks. These quakes and the main tremor are associated with the boundary of the Nazca Plate and the South American Plate.

Earthquake

There was a cluster of earthquakes starting from the one occurring on 16 March with a magnitude of  6.7, and a large earthquake had been expected. The earthquake was felt in Chile, Peru, and Bolivia. The intensity reached intensity VIII (Severe) in Iquique, Chile.

Effects
Four men died of heart attacks and one woman was reportedly crushed to death when a wall collapsed. A loader was crushed by a falling metal structure and died of the injuries afterwards. Electricity and water services were interrupted in the regions of Arica y Parinacota and Tarapacá.

During the aftermath of the earthquake, 293 prisoners escaped from a women's prison in Iquique when a wall collapsed. Many returned voluntarily a short time later, while Chilean soldiers searched for the rest.

According to the Peruvian emergency services, nine people were slightly injured, seven households have been affected, one temple has collapsed and electricity outages in the affected regions of Tacna, Moquegua and Arequipa occurred, which were restored later.

Aftershocks
There were several significant aftershocks above 6.0 magnitude and many more of lower magnitude over subsequent days.

Associated events
Such large earthquakes can have effects far away other than tsunamis.  A megathrust quake can shake the entire earth, but causes stronger movement and strain on the entire associated oceanic plate, beyond the few hundred kilometer rupture zone.  Though too far to be an aftershock, a 6.0 quake on a thin protruding wedge of the Nazca Plate  (Iquique quake shoved this plate) was reported off Panama within 12 hours of the main shock.

Tsunami

Under advice from the Pacific Tsunami Warning Center, tsunami warnings were issued for the Latin American Pacific coastlines of Chile, Peru, and Ecuador shortly after the earthquake occurred.

The tsunami warning was later canceled for all countries except Chile and Peru within a few hours of the earthquake. The tsunami warning was canceled for both Chile and Peru at around 4:58 UTC on 2 April. Hawaii was under a tsunami advisory for over 13 hours. On 3 April local time, tsunamis were observed in Japan.

See also
 1868 Arica earthquake
 1877 Iquique earthquake
 2010 Chile earthquake
 List of earthquakes in 2014
 List of earthquakes in Chile

References

Further reading

External links 

M8.2 - 95km NW of Iquique, Chile – United States Geological Survey
Tsunami alert after 8.2 quake strikes off Chile – BBC News
5 Dead After Powerful Quake Strikes Off Chile's Coast – ABC News
Powerful earthquake strikes off Chile – CNN
Tsunami Animation: Iquique, Chile, 1 April 2014  – National Tsunami Warning Center

2014 Iquique
2014 earthquakes
2014 in Chile
History of Tarapacá Region
Iquique Province
Tsunamis in Chile
Iquique
2014 Iquique
Iquique
April 2014 events in South America